Janice Man (born December 29, 1988) is a Hong Kong actress and fashion model.

Career
Janice Man is an actress and fashion model from Hong Kong and has played leading roles in several Mainland Chinese and Hong Kong movies and TV series, including The Graduation Song, The Legend of Zu, Helios, Cold War 2, Nightfall and The Midnight After.

Janice Man was discovered by talent seekers on the streets of Hong Kong, and became a professional model since the age of 14. Her modeling career took a sharp turn upwards in 2007 when she participated in television series such as 過渡青春 and movies like Love Is Not All Around.  In 2009, August 13, it was announced she signed the contract with Leon Lai's star artist management, A-Music.  She later appeared in Hong Kong's Asia Exhibit, Summer Pop Live in HK, and other live concerts.  Her fame rose steadily in Asia as she was cast in leading roles in several important films and TV series in Hong Kong and China, working with famous co-stars such as Chow Yun-fat, Nick Cheung and Korean Movie Star, Kim Jae-wook. She was also featured in commercials for Opaque, Ipsa, I.T. Group, Bausch & Lomb, Adidas and Forever Mark. Her more recent accomplishments show a slow but steady turn to more film and TV work, with a critically acclaimed performance in Nightfall in 2012, starring along Simon Yam and Michael Wong.

In 2011, she won the Best Dressed award at the 30th Hong Kong Film Awards.

She was the spokesperson of Dr. Kits Hong Kong in 2011, SK-II Facial Treatment Essence from 2013 – 2014 and Adidas Hong Kong's Winter Jacket in 2015.

She is the spokesperson of Bausch & Lomb (Lacelle Series) (from 2011), IPSA and Forevermark (Diamond Ambassador).

Filmography

Film

Television

References

External links
 
 Janice Man on Weibo 
 Janice Man's Xanga
 Janice Man Wing San at Hong Kong Cinemagic

1988 births
Living people
Cantonese people
21st-century Hong Kong actresses
Hong Kong film actresses
Hong Kong television actresses
Hong Kong female models
Hong Kong idols